The 2006–07 Premier Academy League Under–18 season was the tenth edition since the establishment of The Premier Academy League, and the 3rd under the current make-up. The first match of the season was played in August 2006, and the season ended in May 2007.

Leicester City U18 were the champions.

Final league tables

Academy Group A

Academy Group C

Play-off semi-finals

Play-off Final

References

See also 
 Premier Reserve League
 FA Youth Cup
 Football League Youth Alliance
 Premier League
 The Football League

Premier Academy League
Academy
Academy

ja:プレミアアカデミーリーグ